Sarah Vaughan Sings the Mancini Songbook is a 1965 album by Sarah Vaughan, of music composed by Henry Mancini.

Track listing
 "How Soon" (Al Stillman) – 2:41
 "Days of Wine and Roses" (Johnny Mercer) – 2:38
 "Dear Heart" (Ray Evans, Jay Livingston) – 2:53
 "Charade" (Mercer) – 2:50
 "Too Little Time" (Don Raye) – 3:47
 "Dreamsville" (Evans, Livingston) – 3:49
 "Peter Gunn" (Evans, Livingston) – 1:51
 "Moon River" (Mercer) – 2:49
 "(I Love You and) Don't You Forget It" (Stillman) – 2:30
 "Slow Hot Wind" (Norman Gimbel) – 3:36
 "Mr. Lucky" (Evans, Livingston) – 2:27
 "It Had Better Be Tonight (Meglio Stasera)" (Mercer, Franco Migliacci) – 1:44

All music composed by Henry Mancini, lyricists indicated.

Personnel
Sarah Vaughan – vocals
Bill Holman, Billy Byers, Bob James, Frank Foster, Robert Farnon - arranger, conductor

References

1965 albums
Sarah Vaughan albums
Albums produced by Quincy Jones
Mercury Records albums
Henry Mancini tribute albums